Eastern High School is a public high school in Washington, D.C. As of the 2021–2022 school year, it educates 735 students in grades 9 through 12. The school is located in the eastern edge of the Capitol Hill neighborhood, at the intersection of 17th Street and East Capital Street Northeast. Eastern was a part of the District of Columbia Public Schools restructuring project, reopening in 2011 to incoming first-year students and growing by a grade level each year. It graduated its first class in 2015.

Eastern is part of the District of Columbia Public Schools. It was founded in 1890 as the Capitol Hill High School and was later relocated and rebuilt in the collegiate gothic style and renamed Eastern Senior High School. It is one of the oldest continuously operating high schools in the District of Columbia.

Eastern was designated an International Baccalaureate school in 2013 and awarded its first IB diploma in 2015.

History
Established in 1890 as the Capitol Hill High School, the school was first housed in what is now known as the Peabody Elementary School at 5th and C Streets N.E.. In its first year, the school had an enrollment of 170 students, a staff of seven teachers, and a principal. In the second year, the school's enrollment increased to 260 students, and four additional teachers were added.

In 1892, the school moved to a new location at 7th and C Streets S.E. and was renamed Eastern High School. Enrollment continued to increase, and in 1909 citizens organizations in the city's eastern section began to lobby for a new school building. The land where the current school now stands was selected between 1914 and 1915, but World War I delayed construction.

Snowden Ashford, a municipal architect, was selected to design the new school. The Eastern Alumni Association urged Ashford to design the new school in a style quite different from the Elizabethan and Collegiate Gothic style that was his preference. The association lobbied for the more popular Colonial Revival style, but his view prevailed. His designs for the school were prepared in 1921, and shortly after, he resigned from his position as Municipal Architect.

The new Eastern High School building, at 17th and East Capitol Streets N.E., was built in 1923 by Charles H. Tompkins Company Incorporated. A memorial flagstaff was dedicated, in front of the building, to alumni who died during the Spanish-American War and World War I. When the school moved into its new building, its student enrollment increased to over 1,000. The old Eastern High School building at 7th and C Streets S.E. was demolished to make way for Hine Jr. High School.

Admissions

Demographics

Attendance Boundaries
In 2021, DC's redistricting of Wards moved Eastern from Ward 6 to Ward 7; however, the school's boundaries and feeder patterns have remained the same. Neighborhoods within Eastern's boundaries include Barney Circle, Capitol Hill, Carver Langston, Hill East, Kingman Park, Navy Yard, and Southwest Waterfront.

Feeder patterns
The following elementary schools feed into Eastern:
 Amidon-Bowen
 Brent
 J.O. Wilson
 Ludlow-Taylor
 Maury
 Miner
 Payne
 Peabody (Capitol Hill Cluster School)
 Thompson
 Tyler
 Van Ness
 Watkins (Capitol Hill Cluster School)

The following middle schools feed into Eastern:
 Eliot-Hine
 Jefferson
Stuart-Hobson (Capitol Hill Cluster School)

The following K-8 schools feed into Eastern:
 Browne Education Campus
 Capitol Hill Montessori

Athletics

Notable alumni

Academia
Maude E. Aiton (1894), D.C. Public Schools teacher, principal of the Webster Americanization School in Washington D.C.
Calvin Beale (1941), demographer whose work led to the development of the Beale code
Alvin C. Graves (1927), nuclear physicist
Gilbert Hunt (1934), mathematician, tennis player
Franklin McCain (1959), civil rights activist and member of the Greensboro Four
Mary Eleanor Spear (1915), data visualization specialist who pioneered the development of the bar chart and box plot
Ibrahim K. Sundiata (1962), American scholar of West African and African-American history

Arts and entertainment
Gayle Adams (1970), disco music artist
Monta Bell (1909), film director, producer, screenwriter
 Dave Chappelle (attended, did not graduate), actor, comedian
The Choice Four (1969), all-male soul vocal group
Y'Anna Crawley (1995), contemporary gospel music artist and musician; winner on BET's Sunday Best
Pat Flaherty (attended, did not graduate), actor, Major League Baseball pitcher for five teams, punter for the Chicago Bears
Kevin LeVar (1995), singer, songwriter
Bert Sadler (1893), photographer
Frank Wright (1950), painter

Government and politics
Sheila Abdus-Salaam (1970), New York Court of Appeals judge
Vernon D. Acree (1937), Commissioner of the United States Customs Service

Bennett Champ Clark (1908), United States Senator (Missouri), D.C. Circuit court judge
Gail Cobb (attended, did not graduate), D.C. Metropolitan Police officer who was the first female police officer in the United States killed in the line of duty
Stephen Early (1907), White House Press Secretary, United States Deputy Secretary of Defense
Isaac Fulwood (1959), Chief of the Metropolitan Police Department of the District of Columbia (1989–1992)
Calvin H. Gurley (1972), accountant and perennial candidate
George Huddleston Jr. (1937), member of the United States House Of Representatives (Alabama)
 Edna G. Parker (1948), United States Tax Court judge
Gladys Spellman (attended, did not graduate), educator, member of the United States House of Representatives (Maryland)
Brandon Todd (2001), former D.C. Council member

Media and journalism
George D. Beveridge (1940), journalist for the Washington Star
Eleni Epstein (1943), fashion editor for The Washington Star
Jackie Martin (1921), photojournalist
 Andy Ockershausen (1947), Washington-area media executive, longtime manager at WMAL radio
Ira Sabin (1946), founder of JazzTimes magazine
Eugene Scott (1999), political reporter for The Washington Post, former CNN reporter
Krissah Thompson (1993), managing editor for The Washington Post

Military
George S. Blanchard (1938), United States Army four-star general
Lester A. Dessez (1914), United States Marine Corps Brigadier general
Alexander D. Goode (1929), rabbi of the United States Army who was one of the Four Chaplains who gave their lives saving soldiers during the sinking of the Dorchester
Cecil D. Haney (1974), retired United States Navy admiral
Ernest E. Harmon (1911), early aviator
Haywood T. Kirkland (1966), Vietnam veteran who's story inspired the 1995 film, Dead Presidents
Charles T. Lanham (1920), United States Army major general, author, poet
Anthony McAuliffe (1916), United States Army general
Earle Wheeler (1928), United States Army general

Sports
Robin Campbell (attended, did not graduate), Olympic sprinter
Jerry Chambers (1961), former NBA player
Al Chesley (1975), former NFL linebacker (Philadelphia Eagles)
Frank Chesley (1973), former NFL linebacker (Green Bay Packers)
Vince Colbert (1964), former Major League Baseball pitcher, (Cleveland Indians)
Mark Johnson (1989), former professional boxer, International Boxing Hall of Fame inductee
Jimmy Jones (1958), former NFL wide receiver (Chicago Bears)
Gilbert Kelly (1896), American football player (Princeton), football coach (University of Tennessee)
Mike Martin (1979), former NFL wide receiver, (Cincinnati Bengals)
Charles Mooney (1969), American boxer
Josh Morgan (attended, did not graduate), former NFL wide receiver
Art Perry (1964), former collegiate basketball coach
Jamorko Pickett (2016), NBA player (Detroit Pistons)
James Ratiff (1977), American basketball player, (Howard)
 Thomas Robinson (attended, did not graduate), Lebanese basketball player
 Kelvin Scarborough (1983), American basketball player (University of New Mexico)
Dallas Shirley (1931), basketball referee
John Smith (1924), Major League Baseball utility player, (Boston Red Sox)
Mike Wilcher (1979), former NFL linebacker

Notable faculty

References

External links

 

District of Columbia Public Schools
Educational institutions established in 1890
Public high schools in Washington, D.C.
1890 establishments in Washington, D.C.
School buildings completed in 1923